The Left for the Right to Decide (EPDD) was an electoral alliance formed for the 2014 European Parliament elections. The leading candidate was Josep Maria Terricabras.

The alliance consisted of three parties: Republican Left of Catalonia, New Catalan Left and Catalonia Yes. Also form the coalition: Socialisme, Catalunya i Llibertat and Young Republican Left of Catalonia. The program of the alliance promotes the independence of Catalonia and social justice.

Composition

List of candidates
 Josep Maria Terricabras (ERC)
 Ernest Maragall (Catalan New Left)
 Jordi Solé (ERC)
 Elisabet Nebreda (ERC)
 Marie Krapetz (ERC)
 Andreu Criquet (JERC)
 Miquel Àngel Sureda (ER, federation of the Balearic Islands)
 Gabriel Fernàndez (Socialisme, Catalunya i Llibertat)
 Magda Casamitjana (Catalan New Left)
 Eloïsa Chamarro (ERPV, federation of the Valencian Country)

Electoral performance

European Parliament

References

External links
L'Esquerra pel Dret a Decidir

Defunct political party alliances in Spain
Regionalist parties in Spain
Republican Left of Catalonia